Mahmoud Yassin (19 February 1941 – 14 October 2020) was an Egyptian actor. He was an iconic actor in both Egyptian cinema and television, portraying dramatic, psychological and romantic roles.

Career
Yassin studied law at the Ain Shams University in 1964, then he started his acting career in 1968, where he acted in more than 150 films and theatrical plays. His last work was a comedy film Grandpa Habibi in 2012.

Personal life
He married the actress Shahira in October 1970, with whom he had Rania (b. 1972) and Amro (b. 1978).

Death
Having suffered from the Alzheimer's disease for eight years, Yassin died on 14 October 2020.

Selected filmography

Films

TV series

References

External links
Mahmoud Yassin in Arabic movies database

1941 births
2020 deaths
20th-century Egyptian male actors
21st-century Egyptian male actors
Egyptian male film actors
Egyptian male television actors
Egyptian male stage actors
Actors from Port Said
Egyptian Muslims
Ain Shams University alumni
Neurological disease deaths in Egypt
Deaths from Alzheimer's disease